His Hand in Mine is the fifth studio album by  American singer and musician Elvis Presley, released on November 23, 1960 by RCA Victor in mono and stereo, catalog number LPM/LSP 2328. It was the first of three gospel albums that Presley would issue during his lifetime. Recording sessions took place on October 30 and 31, 1960, at RCA Studio B in Nashville, Tennessee. It peaked at #13 on the Top Pop Albums chart. It was certified Gold on April 9, 1969 and Platinum on March 27, 1992 by the Recording Industry Association of America.

Background
Presley had a lifelong, fundamental love of church music, and often used it to rehearse and loosen up before concerts and at the beginning of recording sessions. Presley had earlier devoted an extended play single, Peace in the Valley, to his love for gospel songs, and was eager to record a full album of this music. This fit well with the plans of Presley's manager, Colonel Tom Parker, to steer his client into a family-friendly image as he switched Presley's career concentration toward movie stardom in Hollywood.

Content
All the selections for His Hand In Mine were completed in one fourteen-hour session. The songs "Surrender" and "Crying in the Chapel" were recorded during the session, but were withheld for later issue as singles. "Surrender" would be his first single of 1961 and top the chart, but "Crying in the Chapel" would wait until April 1965 to be issued, going to #3 on the chart. The song "In My Father's House" was arranged and adapted by Elvis Presley which was published by Elvis Presley Music.

Presley later re-recorded "Swing Down Sweet Chariot" (not to be confused with the popular "Swing Low, Sweet Chariot") for the soundtrack of his 1969 film, The Trouble with Girls.

Single releases
"His Hand In Mine" is a gospel song written by Mosie Lister and first recorded by the Statesmen Quartet in 1953. Elvis Presley's version was recorded on October 30, 1960 and was the title track of his 1960 gospel album. The song was released 9 years later as an Easter single on March 25, 1969. The B-side was a more recent recording of How Great Thou Art. Neither side charted and the record sold poorly.

Reissues
In 1976, RCA reissued the album in its lower priced "Pure Gold" series, with new cover art under a new catalogue number, ANL1-1319. This reissue contains the same tracks as the original release.
RCA first reissued the album on compact disc in 1990 with three bonus tracks ("It Is No Secret", "You'll Never Walk Alone" and "Who Am I"). This reissue utilized the revised cover art from the "Pure Gold" series LP reissue.

On March 11, 2008, RCA issued a remastered version of this album on CD, adding as bonus tracks the four songs which had originally appeared on that 1957 EP single Peace in the Valley, its contents later incorporated into Elvis' Christmas Album. The Presley fan-club label Follow That Dream issued an extended two-disc version the same year.

Personnel
Credits sourced from Keith Flynn’s research of AFM contracts and RCA paperwork.
 Elvis Presley – vocals, acoustic guitar
 The Jordanaires – backing vocals
 Millie Kirkham – backing vocals
 Scotty Moore – electric guitar
 Hank Garland – acoustic guitar
 Floyd Cramer – piano
 Bob Moore – double bass
 D.J. Fontana, Buddy Harman – drums
 Boots Randolph – saxophone
 Charlie Hodge – harmony and backing vocals on “His Hand in Mine”, “I Believe in the Man in the Sky”, and “He Knows Just What I Need”

Track listing

Original release

2008 reissue bonus tracks

2008 Follow That Dream reissue

References

External links

LPM-2328 His Hand in Mine Guide part of The Elvis Presley Record Research Database
LSP-2328 His Hand in Mine Guide part of The Elvis Presley Record Research Database
Elvis Presley Discography

Elvis Presley albums
1960 albums
RCA Victor albums
Gospel albums by American artists
Albums produced by Steve Sholes